Pizzo Camino (Pis Camì) is a mountain in the Bergamo Prealps, with a height of .

It belongs  to the massif dividing the upper Val di Scleve from the upper Val Camonica, together with the Concarena and the Cimone della Bagozza. It is on the boundaries between the provinces of Brescia and Bergamo.

The summit is composed from limestone rocks, formed in the middle Triassic period from the former Tethys Ocean. The lower sides have instead a more sandstone-marl composition.

SOIUSA classification 

According to the SOIUSA (International Standardized Mountain Subdivision of the Alps) the mountain can be classified in the following way:
 main part = Eastern Alps
 major sector = Southern Limestone Alps
 section = Bergamasque Alps and Prealps
 subsection = Bergamasque Prealps
 supergroup = Prealpi Bergamasche Orientali
 group = Gruppo Camino-Concarena
 subgroup = Gruppo del Pizzo Camino
 code = II/C-29.II-C.11.b

References 

Mountains of Lombardy
Mountains of the Alps
Two-thousanders of Italy